George Washington is a 2000 American indpendent drama film written and directed by David Gordon Green. Its story centers on a group of children in a depressed small town in North Carolina who band together to cover up a tragic mistake.

The film premiered at the 2000 Berlin International Film Festival and received wide praise from critics.

Plot
The film follows a group of kids growing up in a depressed rural town in North Carolina, as seen through the eyes of 12-year-old Nasia (Candace Evanofski). After breaking up with her show-off boyfriend Buddy (Curtis Cotton III), she withdraws from her delinquent friends and becomes romantically interested in a strange, introverted boy named George Richardson (Donald Holden) who is burdened by the fact that his skull never hardened after birth. Tragedy strikes when George accidentally kills Buddy, and the group, fearing punishment, decide to hide his body. In its aftermath, George takes up the unlikely role of town hero.

Cast
 Candace Evanofski as Nasia 
 Curtis Cotton III as Buddy 
 Donald Holden as George Richardson 
 Damian Jewan Lee as Vernon 
 Rachael Handy as Sonya
 Paul Schneider as Rico Rice 
 Eddie Rouse as Damascus 
 Janet Taylor as Aunt Ruth

Production
George Washington marked David Gordon Green's feature film debut as a screenwriter, film director and film producer. It was also the first feature film role for actor Eddie Rouse.

Reception
The film has an 84% approval rating on Rotten Tomatoes based on 61 reviews, with an average rating of 7.39/10. The website's critical consensus reads, "Languid and melancholy, George Washington is a carefully observed rumination on adolescence and rural life." Roger Ebert of the Chicago Sun-Times selected it as one of the ten best films of 2000, as did Time and New York Times critic Elvis Mitchell.

In Roger Ebert's four star review, he called the cinematography by Tim Orr the best of the year, also writing "it is not about plot, but about memory and regret. It remembers a summer that was not a happy summer, but there will never again be a summer so intensely felt, so alive, so valuable." Jonathan Rosenbaum of the Chicago Reader gave the film a favorable review, writing "You have to bring a lot of yourself to this film if you want it to give something back, but the rewards are considerable." Mick LaSalle of the San Francisco Chronicle called it "a director's baby from the opening frames" and "not like any other movie. That, in itself, makes it something to see. Writer-director David Gordon Green, in his feature debut, has created a visually and emotionally consistent universe." Rolling Stones Peter Travers called David Gordon Green "a writer and director of rare grace and feeling", whose directorial debut is of "startling originality that will haunt you for a good, long time."

Joe Leydon of Variety was one of ten critics (out of 56) to give the film a negative review, calling it an "undistinguished and uninvolving attempt to offer a rural spin on Kids.

References

External links

 
George Washington: These American Lives an essay by Armond White at the Criterion Collection

2000 films
2000s coming-of-age drama films
American coming-of-age drama films
Films directed by David Gordon Green
Films shot in North Carolina
Films set in North Carolina
Culture of Winston-Salem, North Carolina
Southern Gothic films
2000 directorial debut films
2000 independent films
2000 drama films
2000s English-language films
2000s American films
American independent films